Protivanov is a market town in Prostějov District in the Olomouc Region of the Czech Republic. It has about 1,000 inhabitants.

References

Populated places in Prostějov District
Market towns in the Czech Republic